Samut Prakan Hospital is the main hospital of Samut Prakan Province, Thailand. It is classified under the Ministry of Public Health as a regional hospital. It is an affiliated hospital of the Faculty of Medicine, Srinakharinwirot University.

History 
Initially, Samut Prakan Health Station was the first healthcare facility in Pak Nam Samut Prakan town. with a capacity of 25 beds and operated by the Samut Prakan City Municipality. On 1 December 1950, operations were transferred to the Ministry of Public Health and renamed Samut Prakan Hospital. Due to expansion difficulties, the hospital was moved to the current site and opened on 27 September 1965. Today it is a regional hospital with a capacity of 594 beds as of 2022.

The closest urban transit station is Sai Luat BTS station.

See also 

 Healthcare in Thailand
 Hospitals in Thailand
 List of hospitals in Thailand

References 

Hospitals in Thailand
Buildings and structures in Samut Prakan province
Hospitals established in 1950
1950 establishments in Thailand